Kees Koolen (born 19 August 1965 in Bergeijk, North Brabant) is a Dutch rally raid racer and businessman. Koolen participated in various rally raid competitions in a variety of vehicles. Koolen also was the CEO of Booking.com. Currently he is the Chairman/CEO of Koolen Industries: a Dutch clean energy conglomerate.

Business career
Koolen studied technical business administration at the Twente University. Despite not graduating the university, started his own business as an advisor to different companies. During this time Koolen was an angel investor to different internet startups. Koolen was one of the founders of Booking.com, a price comparison website for hotels. He sold the company in 2005 to Booking Holdings for 110 million Euros. Koolen remained Booking.com's CEO until 2011. In 2013 his wealth was estimated at 115 million euro, making him 232nd wealthiest person in the Netherlands.

When Uber placed its headquarters in Amsterdam, Koolen was named by Travis Kalanick as COO. Simultaneously, Koolen founded Agri Brasil, a conglomerate of large dairy farms.

In 2019 Koolen was profiled as a 'day dreamer.' by PVV States member Erik Veltmeijer in newspaper Dagblad De Gelderlander. Veltmeijer speaks of 'a complete failure' and qualifies director Kees Koolen of Lithium Werks en passant as a day dreamer.

Rally raid
Koolen competed in his first Dakar Rally at the 2009 Dakar Rally. Racing a Honda CRF series CRF450 he finished 69th in the motorbike classification.

For the 2010 Dakar Rally, Koolen and his team raced a McRae Enduro buggy. Koolen had a troubled third stage. He passed all check points but stranded on his way to the bivak and had to retire. For the 2011 Dakar Rally Koolen developed his own buggy to compete, the GoKoBra. The team entered two GoKoBra's, one for Koolen and one for teammate Jurgen van den Goorbergh. Koolen was disqualified after the sixth stage. Koolen finished the sixth stage outside the time limit but was given dispensation by the organisation. The organisation later the decided to disqualify Koolen because he missed the first check point. The team finished the 2012 Dakar Rally in 59th place.

Koolen entered his first Dakar Rally with a quad at the 2013 Dakar Rally. He again finished the Dakar Rally, in 17th place. In 2014 Koolen became the first participant to finish the Dakar Rally in all four classes. In 2014 Koolen joined Van den Goorbergh and Gijs van Uden in a Ginaf truck entered by Maxxis Dakar Team Powered by Super B. The team finished in 37th place.

For 2015, Koolen developed his own quad off-road racer. During the Dakar Rally Koolen was arrested by Chilean authorities. During the fifth stage Koolen deviated from the determined route and drove through a protected area. Koolen was released after questioning. Koolen was not the only participant racing through a protected area in the Atacama Desert, Matteo Cassucio was also arrested. The following stage Koolen retired from the rally. For 2016 Koolen returned in his Honda quad with top ten stage results. He did not finish the Dakar Rally after stage nine. After his retirement an incident with a helicopter caused his quad (without rider) to drop fifty meters to the ground.

In 2017 Koolen and his team developed the Barren Racing quad racer. With his self developed quad he scored his first stage win. He won the 219 km stage between Tupiza and Oruro. The stage was shortened because of bad weather. Koolen finished the Dakar Rally in seventeenth place in class.

References

1965 births
Living people
Dakar Rally drivers
Dutch rally drivers
People from Bergeijk
Sportspeople from North Brabant
Booking Holdings
Dutch businesspeople
Dutch corporate directors